Hawaii is a 1966 American epic drama film directed by George Roy Hill. It is based on the eponymous 1959 novel by James A. Michener. It tells the story of an 1820s Yale University divinity student (Max von Sydow) who, accompanied by his new bride (Julie Andrews), becomes a Calvinist missionary in the Hawaiian Islands. It was filmed at Old Sturbridge Village, in Sturbridge, Massachusetts, and on the islands of Kauai and Oahu in Hawaii.

The film was released on October 10, 1966. It received mixed reviews but was a box-office success. It received seven nominations at the 39th Academy Awards, including Best Supporting Actress (for Jocelyne LaGarde).

Plot

In 1819, Prince Keoki Kanakoa appeals to the Yale Divinity School to bring Christianity to the Islands of Hawaii. Newly ordained minister Reverend Abner Hale is among those who volunteer, but all missionaries must be married. Reverend Dr. Thorn introduces him to his young niece, Jerusha Bromley. Jerusha is in love with Captain Rafer Hoxworth, a whaler away at sea who has apparently forgotten her.

Abner and Jerusha marry and go to Lahaina, Maui, where Keoki is reunited with his parents and sister. The missionaries are shocked by what is considered the islanders' sinful ways. Half-naked girls have sex with sailors, and the natives worship Hawaiian idols. Worse, Keoki's father, Kelolo, is both the husband and biological brother of Keoki's mother Malama Kanakoa, the Aliʻi Nui (ruler) whom the natives consider a "sacred person". Incest is believed to maintain a pure royal bloodline, and Keoki is expected to marry his sister, Noelani, who will one day become the Ali'i Nui. However, Keoki, waiting to be ordained a Christian minister, rejects this, creating discord within his family.

The Hales live in a grass hut and work to build a church. Jerusha helps the natives and tries to end disfigured or deformed infants being drowned after rescuing an infant with a facial birthmark. After a difficult labor, Jerusha gives birth to her first child, a son named Micah. Abner baptizes his first convert, a young Hawaiian girl named Iliki who was given to the Hales as a servant.

Malama agrees to learn about Christianity but resists being converted because she would have to send away Kelolo. At the Hales' urging, Malama enacts a curfew for sailors and forbids them fraternizing with island girls. The sailors riot in protest, led by Captain Hoxworth, who has made a stop on his whaling voyage. Hoxworth discovers Jerusha is in Lahaina and married to Reverend Hale, whom he despises for inspiring Malama to impose the restrictions. The sailors partially torch the church, but the Hawaiians help save it, then chase the sailors back to their ships. As retaliation against Abner for marrying Jerusha, Hoxworth entices Iliki to leave the island with him. He tosses Abner overboard when he tries to retrieve her. Abner is attacked by a shark in the sea, leaving him permanently lame.

Malama, on her deathbed, agrees to be baptized a Christian and renounce Kelolo as her husband. As the natives foretold, upon an Ali'i Nui's death, a strong gale blows and destroys the church. Keoki disavows Christianity and returns to his native religion after Abner reveals that he will never be ordained because he is not white. 

Noelani becomes the new Ali'i Nui. Abner discovers that Keoki and Noelani have married and Malama only became a Christian for her people’s good. Noelani and Keoki's baby is born horribly deformed. Abner refuses Jerusha's plea to save the infant, believing it is God's punishment. Keoki drowns the child. A measles outbreak decimates the native population, killing hundreds, including Keoki, who dies renouncing God.

Years of overworking and childbearing have weakened Jerusha, resulting in her early death. After losing Jerusha, Abner becomes more loving and protective of the Hawaiians. He joins them to curtail white settlers and plantation owners from taking more land. When the other ministers vote to own and profit from the land, Abner opposes them and is reassigned to a parish in Connecticut. He refuses to leave Hawaii and sends his three children to the Bromley family in New England. Returning to his hut, Abner finds a young Hawaiian man waiting who wishes to be his assistant. He is overjoyed upon realizing the young man is the disfigured baby Jerusha saved from being drowned many years before.

Cast

Julie Andrews as Jerusha Bromley Hale 
Max von Sydow as Reverend Abner Hale
Richard Harris as Capt. Rafer Hoxworth
Gene Hackman as Dr. John Whipple
Carroll O'Connor as Charles Bromley
Jocelyne LaGarde as Aliʻi Nui, Malama Kanakoa
Manu Tupou as Prince Keoki Kanakoa, narrator in the prologue
Ted Nobriga as Prince Kelolo Kanakoa
Elizabeth Logue as Noelani Kanakoa
John Cullum as Rev. Immanuel Quigley
George Rose as Capt. Janders
Lou Antonio as Rev. Abraham Hewlett
Torin Thatcher as Rev. Dr. Thorn
Michael Constantine as Mason, sailor
Malcolm Atterbury as Gideon Hale
Diane Sherry as Charity Bromley
Lokelani S. Chicarell as Iliki
Robert Oakley as Micah Hale (4 years old)
Henrik von Sydow as Micah Hale (7 years old)
Claes von Sydow as Micah Hale (12 years old)
Bertil Weriefelt as Micah Hale (18 years old)

Bette Midler also had her first on-screen movie appearance as an extra in the film (she can be seen behind a woman covered in a white shawl during Abner's sermon). Heather Menzies (who co-starred with Andrews in The Sound of Music a year earlier) appears as Jerusha's sister Mercy Bromley. The film's costume designer Dorothy Jeakins makes a credited cameo as the Hales matriarch Hepzibah Hale.

Production
The film was based on the book's third chapter (out of seven), entitled From the Farm of Bitterness, which covered the settlement of the island kingdom by its first American missionaries. There are some differences between the novel's third chapter and the film, such as Abner, who was already lame when the time they landed in Lahaina, the riotings already started before Malama enforces laws in the Island, Urania Hewlett's difficult childbirth was changed into Jerusha's, Rafer's character was introduced earlier in the novel (before the missionaries landed in Hawaii), the novel's depiction of the whistling wind scene was more chaotic in the novel than in the film (which several whaling ships sunk) and it occurred the day after Malama's funeral, and other key scenes (such as Rafer bombarding Lahaina and damaging the Fort and the Mission House) were omitted for the film.

Needing a Polynesian female for the key role of Malama, the Alii Nui, the producers hired a native Tahitian for the role. French-speaking Jocelyne LaGarde had never acted before and could not speak English; however, her screen test showed a powerful presence, and the producers hired a coach to train her phonetically to handle the character's dialogue. Of the all-star cast, LaGarde would be the only one to earn an Academy Award nomination and the only one to win a Golden Globe Award. Making early screen appearances in this film were Bette Midler, John Cullum, and future Oscar winner Gene Hackman.

Originally, it was to be directed by Fred Zinnemann, and intending to cast Audrey Hepburn and Alec Guinness as leads. But Zinnemann had fought with United Artists a few years before the film was made and left the production to go to England, to work on A Man for All Seasons. Director George Roy Hill was subsequently asked to work on the film, which he agreed to do, and the film became the only epic he directed. To cast the lead roles, Julie Andrews, fresh from her role as the titular character in Mary Poppins, signed in December 1964 while Max Von Sydow and Richard Harris on February and March 1965 respectively. The film would also feature appearances from Henrik von Sydow and Claes von Sydow, the real sons of star Max von Sydow, who play Abner's son Micah at different ages.

The film was filmed in various locations throughout Oahu in the state of Hawaii, the perfect replica of Lahaina during the 1820s is built on Makua Beach and the surrounding Makua Valley. Despite the Hawaiian setting and filming locations, a significant portion of the props used in the film were imported from Mexico, Taiwan, Ireland, Hong Kong, Japan, and the Philippines.

Principal Photography began in April 1965, on Location in Old Sturbridge Village for scenes set in Walpole, New Hampshire and the Hales' farm (Interiors were filmed in Hollywood soundstages for seven weeks, along with scenes set in Yale College and on board the Thetis). Then on location in the island of Oahu in Hawaii in June. Location filming in Oahu bogged down with heavy rain and tidal wave alerts, which caused the budget to balloon to over $10 million; despite this Producer Walter Mirisch sacked Hill as director, and intended to hire Arthur Hiller as director. Polynesian extras protested and refused to work with another director, so Hill was hired back. Principal Photography ended in November 1965.

Andrews received top billing around the world except in continental Europe, where Sydow's contract stipulated that he receive first and same line billing.

Release
Hawaii had its premiere at the DeMille Theatre in New York City on October 10, 1966. It also opened the same week at the Egyptian Theatre in Los Angeles. It expanded into five further cities the following week, including Honolulu, and another three the following week.

Availability of different versions 
The film as originally released ran 189 minutes (including overture, intermission, entr'acte, and exit music). This roadshow version would be issued on VHS and LaserDisc from the best available elements. For general release, this was then subsequently cut by United Artists to 161 minutes and is the version seen on the 2005 DVD release from MGM Home Video (as the best elements suitable for DVD came from the general release). Both versions have been broadcast on Turner Classic Movies and This TV Network.

On October 9, 2015, Twilight Time Movies announced on the Home Theater Forum that they would release a Blu-ray edition of Hawaii (along with The Hawaiians) on January 19, 2016. The Hawaiians would be released the next month on February 9, 2016. The Hawaii Blu-ray has both the long and short versions, but the long, original version is in standard definition and not anamorphic widescreen.

Reception

Critical reception
The film's critical response was mixed. Vincent Canby of The New York Times wrote that "one comes out the theater not so much moved as numbed — by the cavalcade of conventional if sometimes eyepopping scenes of storm and seascape, of pomp and pestilence, all laid out in large strokes of brilliant De Luxe color on the huge Panavision screen." Arthur D. Murphy of Variety stated, "Superior production, acting and direction give depth and credibility to a personal tragedy, set against the clash of two civilizations." Philip K. Scheuer of the Los Angeles Times wrote that even at three hours in length, the filmmakers "still haven't given themselves enough leeway" to adapt Michener's epic novel, but Hawaii' will still be one of the outstanding Hollywood pictures of 1966."

Time magazine felt that "Instead of portraying the death of one culture and the birth of another, he [George Roy Hill] has restricted himself to the story of one man and his ministry. The spectator is rather too frequently allowed to feel that he is watching a rather small film on a very large screen and to wonder, with a mounting sense of lumbar crisis, why he must pay advanced prices $2.25 to $4.25) for the privilege of sitting through a -hour story that could have been told just as well in two." Richard L. Coe of The Washington Post found the romance between Abner and Jerusha "more trite than credible" and wrote that Max von Sydow "seems to have based his concept of the leading role on a quick course in Roots of Modern America." Brendan Gill of The New Yorker called it "perhaps the biggest empty movie, or the emptiest big movie, ever made. Despite its length and its look of being extremely ambitious, it contains scarcely a single action worth dramatizing." The Monthly Film Bulletin praised the "intelligent and literate" script and "deeply felt performances from the whole cast," but felt "a distinct slackening of interest" after the intermission, as once Malama dies "there is little left except for Jerusha to join her. The real drama is over, and a colorful local wedding hardly compensates for the lack of tension."

The film holds a score of 67% on Rotten Tomatoes based on 9 reviews.

Box office
After expanding to 10 cities, Hawaii reached number one at the US box office. In its first seven weeks of release, it had grossed $1,545,688. Hawaii went on to earn theatrical rentals of $15.6 million in the United States and Canada, which made it the highest-grossing film of 1966.

Accolades

The film is recognized by American Film Institute in these lists:
 2005: AFI's 100 Years of Film Scores – Nominated

See also
 List of American films of 1966
 "Hawaii" (Elmer Bernstein song), the theme song from the film.
 The Hawaiians, a 1970 sequel, which covered later chapters of James Michener's book
 Hawaiian religion
 Kapu, the ancient Hawaiian code of conduct of laws and regulations
 Ancient Hawaii
 Carthaginian, the 1921 ship converted to a square-rigged whaler for the film

References

External links
 

 
 

1966 films
1960s historical drama films
American historical drama films
American epic films
Films scored by Elmer Bernstein
Films based on American novels
Films directed by George Roy Hill
Films featuring a Best Supporting Actress Golden Globe-winning performance
Films produced by Walter Mirisch
Films with screenplays by Dalton Trumbo
United Artists films
Films set in Hawaii
Films set in 1819
Films set in the 1820s
Films set in the 1830s
Films shot in Hawaii
Films based on works by James A. Michener
1966 drama films
1960s English-language films
1960s American films